Zeheba is a genus of moths in the family Geometridae described by Frederic Moore in 1887.

Description
Palpi short, porrect (extending forward) and roughly scaled. Antennae of male ciliated. Hind tibia dilated, with a fold and tuft of long hair on inner side. Forewings highly falcate (sickle shaped) at apex. The outer margin excised from the apex to vein 4, then oblique to outer angle. Vein 3 from angle of cell. Veins 7 to 9 stalked, vein 10 absent and vein 11 free. Hindwings with short and broad cell. Vein 7 and 8 being much arched near base. Vein 3 from angle of cell. The outer margin produced at the vein in male and highly angled at vein 4 in female.

Species
Zeheba lucidata (Walker, 1862) Borneo, Sumatra
Zeheba aureata Moore, [1887] Himalayas, Sumatra
Zeheba marginata Walker Java, Bali
Zeheba aureatoides Holloway, 1993 Borneo, Peninsular Malaysia, Sulawesi
Zeheba spectabilis (Butler, 1877) Australia

References

Ennominae